Apple of Sodom (Calotropis procera) is a species of milkweed in the family Apocynaceae native to the Dead Sea and Sodom, Israel and other desert regions.

Apple of Sodom may also refer to:

 Solanum carolinense or Carolina horsenettle, a nightshade native to North America
 Solanum linnaeanum or devil's apple, formerly Solanum sodomeum, an invasive nightshade native to South Africa
 Solanum mammosum or nipplefruit, a nightshade native to South America
 "Apple of Sodom" (song), a song by Marilyn Manson
Apples of Sodom, a 1913 Edison film

See also
Soda apple